Bruce R. Neidlinger is a game designer who has worked primarily on role-playing games.

Career
Bruce Neidlinger was one of the original principles of Iron Crown Enterprises, along with Pete Fenlon, S. Coleman Charlton, Richard H. Britton, Terry K. Amthor, Bruce Shelley, Kurt Fischer, Heike Kubasch, and Olivia Fenlon. By the end of 1982, ICE was profitable enough that Neidlinger went full-time and began taking a salary.

Neidlinger later became the CEO of Mjolnir LLC.

References

External links
 Bruce Neidlinger :: Pen & Paper RPG Database archive

Living people
Role-playing game designers
Year of birth missing (living people)